Norman Rodgers (1891–1947) was an English footballer who played in the Football League for Blackburn Rovers and Stockport County.

References

1891 births
1947 deaths
English footballers
Association football forwards
English Football League players
Stockport County F.C. players
Blackburn Rovers F.C. players